Bjørndalen or Bjorndalen, sometimes Bjoerndalen is a surname.  People with this name include: 

Dag Bjørndalen, Norwegian biathlete 
Ida Bjørndalen, Norwegian handball player
Nathalie Santer-Bjørndalen, Italian biathlete
Ole Einar Bjørndalen, Norwegian biathlete